Fritz Ruland (11 January 1914 – 7 January 1999) was a German cyclist. He competed in the individual and team road race events at the 1936 Summer Olympics.

References

External links
 

1914 births
1999 deaths
German male cyclists
Olympic cyclists of Germany
Cyclists at the 1936 Summer Olympics
Cyclists from Cologne